The Illinois Institute of Technology campuses house many historic and modern buildings.

Illinois Institute of Technology
Illinois Institute of Technology
Architecture in Illinois
Illinois Institute of Technology